The following roads are named Mission Boulevard:
 Mission Boulevard (East Bay, California) in the San Francisco East Bay Area, including:
 the segment of California State Route 185 running from the unincorporated community of Ashland south to the City of Hayward
 the segment of California State Route 238 running from Hayward south to Fremont
 the entirety of California State Route 262 in Fremont
Mission Boulevard (Southern California), a former routing of California State Route 60